1891 East Sydney colonial by-election may refer to 

 1891 East Sydney colonial by-election 1 held on 14 April 1891
 1891 East Sydney colonial by-election 2 held on 7 November 1891

See also
 List of New South Wales state by-elections